A list of films produced in France in 2001.

Films

References

External links
2001 in France
2001 in French television
French films of 2001 on IMDb
French films of 2001 at Cinema-francais.fr

2001
Films
French

da:Franske film fra 2000